Rodney Maxwell Galt (9 October 1951 – 9 April 2019) was an Australian rules footballer in the Victorian Football League (VFL) and South Australian National Football League (SANFL).

Galt made his debut for St Kilda in 1971 before moving to Carlton in 1975, where he debuted in Round 17, 1975. He was delisted by Carlton after the 1979 VFL season but continued to play elsewhere, firstly for SANFL club West Torrens and then for Prahran in the Victorian Football Association (VFA).

He later was the head of surfwear company Byrning Spears and purchased a beachfront house on the Gold Coast for $17 million. He later sold it for only $9.5 million after falling in debt.

References

External links
 
 
 Rod Galt at Blueseum

Carlton Football Club players
St Kilda Football Club players
West Torrens Football Club players
Prahran Football Club players
Australian rules footballers from Victoria (Australia)
Australian businesspeople
1951 births
2019 deaths